The 2014 Fast5 Netball World Series was the sixth staging of the annual World Netball Series. The tournament was held at Vector Arena in Auckland, for the 3rd year in a row. The 2014 tournament was contested by the six top national netball teams in 2014. New Zealand won the grand final against Australia, and claimed their 4th World Netball Fast5 series title.

Overview

Teams
The 6 teams that participated in the tournament include:

  South Africa
  Jamaica
  Australia
  England
  Malawi
  New Zealand

Date and Venue
The 2014 Fast5 Netball World Series was played in Auckland New Zealand over 2 days in November. All matches were held at Vector Arena, which has a capacity of 12,000.

Draw and results

Round robin table
1. New Zealand (5 wins, 0 losses, 0 draws) 
2. Australia (4 wins, 1 loss, 0 draws) 
3. Jamaica (3 wins, 2 losses, 0 draws) 
4. England (2 wins, 3 losses, 0 draws) 
---  
5. South Africa (1 win, 4 losses, 0 draws)  
6. Malawi (0 wins, 5 losses, 0 draws)

Final Placings

References

2014
Fast5
Fast5
2014 in Australian netball
2014 in New Zealand netball
2014 in English netball
2014 in South African women's sport
2014 in Malawian sport
2014 in Jamaican sport